Garhi is a small village and tehsil in Rajasthan, approximately 38 kilometres south of the Banswara District administrative seat which is 600 km from the Rajasthan capital of Jaipur. It is located at 23°36'0N 74°8'0E with an altitude of 148 metres (488 feet). It has basic facilities available nearby, such as banks, senior secondary school for girls and boys, teachers' training school

References

Villages in Banswara district